The 2013 Texas A&M–Commerce Lions football team represented Texas A&M University-Commerce in the 2013 NCAA Division II football season. They were led by head coach Colby Carthel, who was in his first season at A&M-Commerce. The Lions played their home games at Memorial Stadium and were members of the Lone Star Conference (LSC). The Lions finished fifth in the LSC, and their 7–5 record was their first season above .500 since 2001. They were selected to participate in the Live United Texarkana Bowl, their first postseason appearance since the 1995 NCAA Division II playoffs.

Schedule

Postseason awards

All-Americans
Charlie Tuaau, First Team Defensive Line

All-Lone Star Conference

LSC Superlatives
Defensive Lineman of the Year: Charlie Tuaau
Defensive Player of the Year: Charlie Tuaau
Receiver of The Year: Vernon Johnson

LSC First Team
Vernon Johnson, Receiver 
Charlie Tuaau, Defensive Line
Tevin Moore, Defensive Line

LSC Second Team
Ronald Fields, Cornerback
Marcus Fore, Safety
Cameron Frosch, Punter
Jordan Jenkins, Tight End 
Vernon Johnson, Return Specialist 
Cole Pitts, Linebacker 
Seth Smith, Receiver

LSC Honorable Mention
Stephen Ford, Linebacker
K.J. Garrett, Running Back 
Trevor Goodale, Offensive Line 
Saul Martinez, Kicker 
Cameron Rogers, Deep Snapper 
Andrew Weidel, Offensive Line

References

Texas AandM-Commerce
Texas A&M–Commerce Lions football seasons
Texas AandM-Commerce Lions Football